Gary Beecham is a studio glass artist of North Carolina.

Education, work
Beecham's attended the University of Wisconsin–Madison, where he was awarded a Bachelor of Science in Art in 1979. He worked for a year in 1978 at the J. & L. Lobmeyr glassworks in Vienna, Austria before returning to the United States to settle in Spruce Pine, North Carolina. There he worked from 1980 to 1985 as an assistant to Harvey Littleton. Thereafter Beecham began his own career in glass, creating in the techniques of free-blowing, fusing and carving glass.

Collections
Beecham's work has been collected by the Glasmuseet Ebeltoft, Ebeltoft, Denmark; Düsseldorf Art Museum in Ehrenhof, Düsseldorf; Frauenau Glass Museum, Germany; Asheville Art Museum, Asheville, North Carolina; High Museum of Art, Atlanta, Georgia and Mint Museum of Art, Charlotte, North Carolina.

References

Waldrich, Joachim, "Who's Who in Contemporary Glass Art: A Comprehensive Guide to Glass Artists – Craftsmen – Designers", Joachim Waldrich Verlag, Munich, Germany 1993
Maurine Littleton Gallery, "Gary Beecham: August 28-September 30, 1994", unpaginated (exhibition brochure, list of collections)

1955 births
Living people
American glass artists
People from Mitchell County, North Carolina
People from Ladysmith, Wisconsin
Artists from North Carolina
Artists from Wisconsin
 University of Wisconsin–Madison College of Letters and Science alumni